The 1994 FIS Ski Jumping Grand Prix was the 1st Summer Grand Prix season in ski jumping on plastic. Season began on 3 August 1994 in Hinterzarten, Germany and ended on 24 August 1994 in Stams, Austria.

Other competitive circuits this season included the World Cup and Continental Cup.

Calendar

Men

Men's team

Standings

Overall

References

Grand Prix
FIS Grand Prix Ski Jumping